The Humbug Formation is a geologic formation in Utah. It preserves fossils dating back to the Mississippian (Meramecian) of the Carboniferous period.

Description 
The Humbug Formation includes intercalated limestones, orthoquartzitic sandstones, and dolomite.

Fossil content 
The following fossils have been reported from the formation:
Bryozoans

 Fenestella acarinata
 F. crockfordae
 F. hamithensis
 F. rarinodosa
 F. serratula
 F. tooelensis
 F. trifurcata
 Hemitrypa reticulata
 Polypora micronodosa
 P. stansburyensis
 Ptylopora eliasi
 Septopora sp.

See also 
 List of fossiliferous stratigraphic units in Utah
 Paleontology in Utah

References

Bibliography 
 L. H. Burckle. 1960. Some Mississippian fenestrate bryozoa from central Utah. Journal of Paleontology 34(6):1077-1098

Carboniferous geology of Utah
Carboniferous System of North America
Viséan
Dolomite formations
Shallow marine deposits
Carboniferous southern paleotropical deposits
Paleontology in Utah